The Danville race riot occurred on July 25, 1903, in Danville, Illinois, when a mob sought to lynch a black man who had been arrested. On their way to county jail, an altercation occurred that led to the death of a rioter and the subsequent lynching of another black man. At least two other black residents were also assaulted. The rioters failed to overtake the police stationed at the jail and the Illinois National Guard restored order the next day.

History
A black man, James Wilson, had been arrested for the assault of a white woman in Alvin, Illinois, north of Danville. A mob of about 600 formed to storm the county jail in Danville to kill Wilson. En route, they encountered another black man, a native of Evansville, Indiana, who has been variously identified as J. D. Mayfield, John D. Metcalf, or Bud Fruit. In the ensuing altercation, he shot and killed a member of the mob. Mayfield was intercepted by police and was taken to the nearby police station. Officers barricaded the doors, but they were unable to hold back the mob. Mayfield was captured and taken to the spot where the altercation occurred. There, he was lynched by hanging on the nearest telephone pole.

After Mayfield died, the mob took down is body and brought it to the Danville public square in front of the county jail. The mob burned Mayfield's body, shot at it, and hacked it into pieces. The mob, which had grown to about 1,000 people, was able to batter the door of the jail down, but the sheriff and the deputies managed to shoot several of the rioters. The mob retreated and reorganized. Two miners in Westfield brought dynamite to destroy the walls of the jail, but they were intercepted by police in Himrod.

The mob largely dispersed overnight, but two other unidentified black residents were beaten with clubs and left in the street. Order was restored after the state deployed the 7th regiment of the Illinois National Guard. Danville Mayor John Beard declined to press any charges against the rioters.

See also
 Lynching of David Wyatt

References

1903 in Illinois
1903 murders in the United States
1903 riots
Danville, Illinois
Lynching deaths in Illinois
Racially motivated violence against African Americans
Riots and civil disorder in Illinois